The meridian 111° east of Greenwich is a line of longitude that extends from the North Pole across the Arctic Ocean, Asia, the Indian Ocean, the Southern Ocean, and Antarctica to the South Pole.

The 111th meridian east forms a great circle with the 69th meridian west.

From Pole to Pole
Starting at the North Pole and heading south to the South Pole, the 111th meridian east passes through:

{| class="wikitable plainrowheaders"
! scope="col" width="130" | Co-ordinates
! scope="col" | Country, territory or sea
! scope="col" | Notes
|-
| style="background:#b0e0e6;" | 
! scope="row" style="background:#b0e0e6;" | Arctic Ocean
| style="background:#b0e0e6;" |
|-
| style="background:#b0e0e6;" | 
! scope="row" style="background:#b0e0e6;" | Laptev Sea
| style="background:#b0e0e6;" |
|-
| 
! scope="row" | 
| Krasnoyarsk Krai — Taymyr Peninsula
|-
| style="background:#b0e0e6;" | 
! scope="row" style="background:#b0e0e6;" | Khatanga Gulf
| style="background:#b0e0e6;" |
|-valign="top"
| 
! scope="row" | 
| Krasnoyarsk Krai — for about 14km Sakha Republic — for about 14km from  Krasnoyarsk Krai — for about 13km from  Sakha Republic — from  Krasnoyarsk Krai — from  Sakha Republic — from Irkutsk Oblast — from  Republic of Buryatia — from  Zabaykalsky Krai — from 
|-
| 
! scope="row" | 
|
|-valign="top"
| 
! scope="row" | 
|-
| style="background:#b0e0e6;" | 
! scope="row" style="background:#b0e0e6;" | South China Sea
| style="background:#b0e0e6;" |
|-valign="top"
| 
! scope="row" | 
| Island of Hainan
|-valign="top"
| style="background:#b0e0e6;" | 
! scope="row" style="background:#b0e0e6;" | South China Sea
| style="background:#b0e0e6;" | Passing through the disputed Paracel Islands
|-
| 
! scope="row" | 
| Sarawak – on the island of Borneo
|-
| 
! scope="row" | 
| Island of BorneoWest KalimantanCentral Kalimantan
|-
| style="background:#b0e0e6;" | 
! scope="row" style="background:#b0e0e6;" | Java Sea
| style="background:#b0e0e6;" |
|-
| 
! scope="row" | 
| Island of Java
|-
| style="background:#b0e0e6;" | 
! scope="row" style="background:#b0e0e6;" | Indian Ocean
| style="background:#b0e0e6;" |
|-
| style="background:#b0e0e6;" | 
! scope="row" style="background:#b0e0e6;" | Southern Ocean
| style="background:#b0e0e6;" |
|-
| 
! scope="row" | Antarctica
| Australian Antarctic Territory, claimed by 
|-
|}

e111 meridian east

pt:Meridiano 112 E